Lapp Codicil of 1751 is an addendum to the Stromstad Treaty of 1751 that defined the Norwegian-Swedish border. It consists of 30 sections.

This special codicil formalised the rights of the Lapps or Sámi (Sami people) to continue with their traditional migratory reindeer herding across the newly formalised border between the then Danish territory of Norway and Sweden. It also had provisions about citizenship and taxes among other things.

When Finland was ceded from Sweden to Russia, the Lapp Codicil lost its formal value along the Finland–Norway border, and in 1852, the border of Norway–Finland/Russia was closed, causing trouble for the Sami, who needed the Finnish forests for reindeer winter grazing. In 1889 Russia also closed the Finland–Sweden border. Norwegian farmers dislikes the reindeers, and since most Samis south of the Norway–Finland–Sweden tripoint were Swedish, the Norwegian government tried to limit these reindeers. A treaty in 1919 limited the number of Swedish reindeers, and more in a treaty in 1972. In 2005 the validity of the 1972 treaty ended, but Norway kept it in its laws.

The codicil has been considered to guarantee Sami rights in traditional Sami areas and is still considered of importance in the debate about these rights.

In 2021, the document was moved to Kautokeino, according to media.

References 

Legal history of Sweden
Legal history of Norway
Legal history of Denmark
Sámi history
1751 in Europe
1751 in Denmark
1751 in Norway
1751 in Sweden
Sweden during the Age of Liberty